Henry Richard Farquharson (1857 – 19 April 1895) was an English landowner and Conservative politician.

Farquharson was born at Brighton and became the owner of a large estate at Eastbury House, Tarrant Gunville (near Blandford Forum in Dorset). He was a keen breeder of Newfoundland dogs and had a pack of one hundred and twenty five.  He imported them through the port of Poole, Dorset and had a Crufts winner.

He was elected at the 1885 general election as Member of Parliament (MP) for West Dorset, and held the seat until his death. In 1891, an unnamed West of England M.P., now believed to have been Henry Richard Farquharson, was mentioned in a newspaper article as claiming that Jack the Ripper, the infamous murderer in the impoverished Whitechapel District in the East End of London, was the son of a surgeon and that he committed suicide after he had committed murder of Mary Jane Kelly on the night of 9 November 1888.  It is believed that the reference was to Montague John Druitt, a fellow West County man, who committed suicide at the end of November 1888 and whose body was retrieved from the Thames at Chiswick a month later. Druitt was born in Wimborne Minster, Dorset, England, the second son of prominent local surgeon William Druitt, and his wife Ann (née Harvey).

In the 1892 election, Farquharson libelled his opponent C. T. Gatty, and was forced to pay £5000 damages a year later.

He died on 19 April 1895, in the Red Sea, on a voyage home from Colombo, Ceylon.

References

External links 
 

1857 births
1895 deaths
Conservative Party (UK) MPs for English constituencies
UK MPs 1885–1886
UK MPs 1886–1892
UK MPs 1892–1895
Dog breeders
People from Blandford Forum
English landowners
19th-century British businesspeople